You All Are Captains (original title: Todos vós sodes capitáns) is a 2010 drama film written and directed by Oliver Laxe.

Synopsis 
A European filmmaker is making a movie with children living in a foster home for socially excluded youngsters in Tangier, Morocco. While filming, the director's unorthodox methods of working cause his relationship with the children to disintegrate to such a point that the initial course of the project is altered.

Awards 
 FIPRESCI Prize , 2010 Cannes Film Festival
 Mar del Plata 2010
 Gijón 2010
 Cineuropa Santiago de Compostela 2010

External links 
 
 

2010 films
Spanish documentary films
2010 documentary films
Documentary films about African cinema
Documentary films about orphanages
Films directed by Oliver Laxe
Films shot in Morocco
2010s Spanish films